The 2001 Daytona 500, the 43rd running of the event, was the first race of the 2001 NASCAR Winston Cup Series schedule. It was held on February 18, 2001, at Daytona International Speedway in Daytona Beach, Florida, consisting of 200 laps and 500 miles on the 2.5-mile (4 km) asphalt tri-oval.

Bill Elliott won the pole and Michael Waltrip, in his first race in the No. 15 car for Dale Earnhardt, Inc., won the race. This was the first Winston Cup victory of his career, coming in his 463rd start, the longest wait for a first win. His teammate Dale Earnhardt Jr. finished second and Rusty Wallace finished third.

On the final lap, a fatal accident occurred involving Dale Earnhardt Sr., Ken Schrader, and Sterling Marlin. Earnhardt's car crashed head-on into the retaining wall, killing him. The race was also marred by an 18-car pile-up on lap 173 that began when Ward Burton made contact with Robby Gordon, sending Tony Stewart flipping twice down the backstretch. After Earnhardt's death - as well as other notable deaths of other drivers in other NASCAR national touring series in previous seasons -  NASCAR, implemented rigorous safety improvements in later seasons. The 2001 Daytona 500 is the last NASCAR Cup Series race to involve a fatal accident.

Entry list

Qualifying 
Qualifying to determine positions 1-2 for the Daytona 500 and the lineup for the Gatorade Duels happened on February 10, 2001. Originally, Bill Elliott and Jerry Nadeau were slated to start first and second, respectively. However, during post qualifying inspection, NASCAR determined that Nadeau had an unapproved shock absorber and spring shackle, and his time was disqualified. Stacy Compton, who was originally third, moved up to second.

Dwayne Leik would be the only driver to not set a time.

Race summary 

Polesitter Bill Elliott led the field to the green flag, but he only led one lap before Sterling Marlin (the winner of the first 125-mile qualifying race three days earlier) passed him for the lead. On lap 29, Rusty Wallace drove into his pit after his right front tire had suddenly gone flat. NASCAR determined that he had exceeded the pit road speed limit on his way in and he was consequently issued a 15-second penalty. As a result, he went a lap down and attempted to make up for it by skipping the first scheduled pit stop. The first caution came out on lap 48 when Jeff Purvis bounced off the wall between turns 3 & 4. The race restarted and stayed under a long green-flag run that lasted 105 laps, in which Ward Burton led the most. On lap 87, Dale Earnhardt and rookie Kurt Busch made door-to-door contact coming out of turn 4 while battling for fifth place. Earnhardt promptly flipped Busch the bird at 185 mph or, as described by lap-by-lap commentator Mike Joy, he simply was saying "Kurt, you're number 1".

The second caution came out on lap 157 when Busch, trying to pass Joe Nemechek, hit the front stretch wall and slid across the track right through the infield and onto pit road. On lap 167, Steve Park took the lead, only to be passed by his teammate Michael Waltrip on the next lap.

On lap 173, a huge crash eliminated 18 cars in a spectacular fashion. This began when Robby Gordon, coming onto the back straightaway, turned Ward Burton in the outside lane. Burton then hit Tony Stewart, who turned back across the middle of the racetrack, collecting most of the field behind him. Stewart took the worst ride of any driver in that crash, as his car turned against the wall after being hit by Burton, caught a pocket of air, got pushed airborne over Robby Gordon and flipped over twice, and then landed on top of Jason Leffler before coasting to a stop in the infield. Bobby Labonte's hood broke off and got attached to Stewart's car, causing his engine to catch fire. Stewart's vehicle was described as something similar to Richard Petty's rollover crash in the 1988 race. Mark Martin collided first with the outside wall and then got hit by at least two other cars, destroying the rear end of his. Martin managed to limp his car back to pit road and abandon it. Also involved in this crash were Jeff Gordon, Terry Labonte, Andy Houston, Buckshot Jones, Dale Jarrett (the defending Daytona 500 winner), Jeff Burton, Elliott Sadler, Kenny Wallace, John Andretti, and Jerry Nadeau. Only a few drivers, including Earnhardt; Elliott; Ron Hornaday Jr.; and Ken Schrader, were able to avoid the crash with intact cars. The race was red-flagged for extensive cleanup. When the red flag was over, the race restarted on lap 180, with Dale Earnhardt Jr. in the lead. Marlin led the next three laps before Waltrip took over again.

With less than two laps remaining, Darrell Waltrip in the Fox Sports booth commented that "Sterling [Marlin] ha[d] beat the front end off of that...that ole Dodge just trying to get around Dale [Earnhardt]." As the white flag waved for the final lap, both Earnhardt and his son Dale Earnhardt Jr. were right behind Waltrip. Earnhardt Jr. was in second place in front of his father. Heading into turn 3, Earnhardt, holding third-place, ran in the middle lane of the pack. Marlin, who was behind him on his left, ran in the inside one. R. Wallace drove his navy blue No. 2 Penske Racing Ford directly behind Earnhardt, and Schrader ran in the outside lane driving his yellow No. 36 Pontiac. Just as the field headed into turn 4, Marlin's car made contact with the left rear on Earnhardt's car, causing the black No. 3 to slide off the track's steep banking onto the flat apron. Trying to correct at speed, Earnhardt sharply turned it up the track toward the outside retaining wall. Although it briefly looked as if he was going to avoid hitting the retaining wall, Earnhardt went right into Schrader's path and Schrader rammed into him behind the passenger door causing Earnhardt's car to snap, rapidly changing its angle toward the wall. As Schrader came into contact, Earnhardt crashed into the wall nose-first at an estimated speed of 155–160 mph. Both cars slid down the steep banking off the track and into the infield grass. While this two-car wreck was in progress, drivers were allowed to race to the finish under green flag conditions.

Seconds later, Waltrip (after 462 races without a win) claimed his first Winston Cup victory, with his teammate Earnhardt Jr. 0.124 seconds behind to finish second. The yellow and checkered flags came out simultaneously as Waltrip crossed the line, locking the rest of the field in their positions at that moment.  R. Wallace finished third, Ricky Rudd finished fourth, Elliott (the polesitter) finished fifth, R. Wallace's brother Mike finished sixth, Marlin (who got loose after making contact with Earnhardt) finished seventh, Bobby Hamilton finished eighth, Jeremy Mayfield finished ninth, and outside polesitter Stacy Compton came across the line tenth. Nemechek finished 11th on the lead lap. Earnhardt and Schrader were credited finishing 12th and 13th despite not finishing the race. After crossing the finish line behind his teammate, Earnhardt Jr. stopped at the site of his father's wreck at turn 4. Earnhardt was extricated from his car and was transported by ambulance to the nearby Halifax Medical Center, where he was pronounced dead at 5:16 pm EST, reportedly surrounded by his wife Teresa, his team owner and closest friend Richard Childress, and his son Earnhardt Jr. The official announcement of Earnhardt's death was made at about 7:00 pm EST by NASCAR president Mike Helton. The death of the seven-time Winston Cup Champion largely overshadowed Waltrip's first Winston Cup victory as well as the 18-car crash on lap 173.

Results

Media 
The 2001 Daytona 500 marked the first Cup Series race under NASCAR's new centralized television contracts, which shifted responsibility for NASCAR's media rights from the track owners (which led to events being inconsistently scattered across multiple networks, including long-time rightsholder CBS) to NASCAR itself. NASCAR entered into six-year deals with two broadcasters, Fox Sports and NBC Sports (with NBC sub-licensing cable rights to TNT, and Fox using its then-sister cable network FX), to serve as rightsholders for each respective half of the season in the Winston Cup Series and Busch Series. Fox and NBC alternated rights to the two Daytona race weekends annually.

Mike Joy joined Fox from CBS to continue as lead announcer. Former driver Darrell Waltrip and crew chief Larry McReynolds would join Joy in the booth as analysts. Joy, Waltrip, and McReynolds would consistently remain Fox's on-air team until 2016, when McReynolds became the rules and technical analyst, replaced in the booth by Jeff Gordon. Darrell Waltrip retired from broadcasting in June 2019, leaving Joy and Gordon as a two-man booth for the 2020 season until Clint Bowyer was hired for the 2021 season and Gordon leaving at the end of the season.

References 

Daytona 500
Daytona 500
NASCAR races at Daytona International Speedway
NASCAR controversies